Our Culture Mag (stylised ourculture) is a British arts and culture online magazine launched in 2016 by Modestas Mankus , based in Cambridge, England. It covers film, fashion, music, art, photography and literature.

History

In 2016, Modestas Mankus launched Our Culture Mag, an online magazine covering latest news in the world of underground and mainstream music. In April 2017, the website announced that will cover film, art, and fashion. In October 2017, Our Culture Mag began covering gaming. The magazine has interviewed creatives such as Jonas Mekas, Son Lux, and Andy Nyman.

In February 2018, Our Culture Mag added Literature as part of their website.

In January 2019, Our Culture Mag announced the launch of their affiliate website OC Lifestyle. The website's purpose was to replace Pay-per-click advertisement and to enhance the experience behind Our Culture Mag. In February 2019, Our Culture Mag launched Filmland, a forum that allows British filmmakers, film fanatics and critics to discuss film. Filmland became defunct in January 2020.

In 2020, Our Culture Mag partnered with Mercedes-Benz Fashion Week Russia as their media partner.

References

External links
 

Online magazines published in the United Kingdom
British entertainment websites
Magazines established in 2016